The Godavari Superfast Express is a Superfast train belonging to Indian Railways that runs between  and CSMT Mumbai Chatrapati Shivaji Maharaj Terminus in India.

Coaches

Godavari Superfast Express presently has 1 AC Chair Car, 3 2nd Class seating & 14 General Unreserved coaches.

Service

The 12118/12117 Godavari Superfast Express covers the distance of 245 kilometres in 4 hours 25 mins (55.47 km/hr) in both directions. As the average speed of the train is above 55 km/hr, as per Indian Railways rules, its fare includes a Superfast surcharge.

Traction

It is hauled end to end by a Kalyan-based WCAP 2 locomotive.

Gallery

Timetable

12118 Godavari Superfast Express leaves Manmad Junction every day at 08:35 hrs IST and reaches Chatrapati Shivaji Maharaj Terminus at 13:28 hrs IST the same day.
12117 Godavari Superfast Express leaves Chatrapati Shivaji Maharaj Terminus every day at 15:45 hrs IST and reaches Manmad Junction at 20:28 hrs IST the same day.

See also
 Panchvati Express
 Manmad Mumbai CST Rajya Rani Express

References 

Express trains in India
Rail transport in Maharashtra
Transport in Mumbai
Transport in Manmad
Named passenger trains of India